Acorn Antiques: The Musical! is a musical about an antiques dealer, based on the parodic soap opera of the same name by Victoria Wood. It premiered in the West End in 2005, and starred Julie Walters and Celia Imrie. The musical won the Olivier Award for Best Performance in a Supporting Role in a Musical and was nominated as Best New Musical.

Concept and production
Victoria Wood decided to revive the original concept to satirise musical theatre with Acorn Antiques: The Musical!, with the intent to give people a "lovely, happy night in the theatre.". It was directed by Trevor Nunn, and opened at the Theatre Royal, Haymarket in February 2005 for a three-month sell-out run. Parodying successful musicals such as Les Misérables and Chicago, it also caricatured the trend for socio-realism in contemporary drama and the conventions of song and choreography in musicals.

Casting
The musical featured three of the principal actors from the original reprising their roles: Celia Imrie as Miss Babs, Duncan Preston as Mr Clifford, and Julie Walters as Mrs Overall. Wood understudied the latter role, appearing on Monday nights and Wednesday matinees, in order to relieve pressure on Walters while preventing disappointment for audiences. Wood's original character, Miss Berta, was played during workshops by Janie Dee; when Dee was unavailable for the West End run, she was replaced by Sally Ann Triplett. The musical also introduced Miss Bonnie (Josie Lawrence), a sister of Miss Babs and Miss Berta (in the original series, Berta and Babs were cousins).

The musical marked the end of an era in which Walters, Imrie, and Preston appeared in nearly all of Wood's productions; Wood's biographer, Jasper Rees, later noted that "Victoria could no longer simply click her fingers and summon the gang". As Wood developed the musical, Imrie "didn't think it was a good idea and [told her] so"; Preston was supportive, but sceptical that it would come to fruition. Although Walters subsequently reprised the role of Bo Beaumont in Victoria Wood's Mid Life Christmas, neither Imrie nor Preston worked with Wood again. Preston commented of the experience, "There was an unspoken agreement that this was sort of it."

DVD release
In 2005, a performance with the original cast was filmed; it was released on DVD on 13 March 2006. Special features include featurettes which showed Victoria Wood playing the role of Mrs Overall on the nights that Julie Walters did not appear.

Plot
The plot revolves around the original (fictional) actors reprising their roles from stage. Contrary to their wishes, the experimental director adapts it into a gritty commentary on British suburban life, although the cast, led by Bo Beaumont (Julie Walters), want a fun piece with a good tap number. After a disastrous open dress rehearsal, the cast hijack the concept to return it to its original roots, and take it to the West End, funded by Bo Beaumont's lottery win.

The second act is the musical within the musical, and is much more like the original series. Miss Babs (Celia Imrie) and Miss Berta (Sally Ann Triplett) run Acorn Antiques, aided by their employees and friends, Mrs Overall (Walters) and Mr Clifford (Duncan Preston). Soon, they discover a third sister, Miss Bonnie (Josie Lawrence), who is initially scheming and devious (for instance, she fires Mrs Overall, even after finding out she's her mother). The plot unfolds, the sisters are faced with financial woes, and family secrets. The show ends with the triumphant return of Mrs Overall, a windfall, and the union of Miss Berta and Mr Clifford.

Reception
The musical received mixed reviews. Mark Shenton of the BBC criticised the show for extending a sketch into a three-hour-long musical, but mentioned that Julie Walters was "inimitable" and to see her "shuffling onto the stage as the perpetually stooped and crumpled Mrs Overall – tea tray in hand with macaroons at the ready – is enough to induce guffaws of recognition." Like Shenton, Philip Fisher of The British Theatre Guide lamented the record-breaking high levels of ticket price (up to £65), but lauded the performances and enthusiasm of the project. A Teletext review voiced the opinion that the plot lacked depth, and that it wasn't a great theatrical performance. The Stage said that it would have been better if Victoria Wood had drafted in aid with the musical, and also stated that it really starts at the beginning of the second act (see Revival), but that it contained "enough entertainment and wit to keep the faithful happy", and said that "the second half begins, to the palpable delight of the audience, with the show they have come to see – with missed cues, fluffed lines and preposterous plots gloriously intact".
However, it played to full houses, and was nominated for Best New Musical, Best Actress in a Musical (Julie Walters) and Best Performance in a Supporting Role in a Musical (Celia Imrie) at the Laurence Olivier Awards, and won Best Supporting Actress. The original series and the musical were released on DVD in the UK in January 2005 and March 2006 respectively.

A routine from the show closed the 2005 BAFTA tribute to Victoria Wood; however, in 2007 she said that creating the musical was a "bad idea" as it harmed her credentials as a serious playwright.

Revival
In early 2006 it was announced that the musical would be revived and tour the UK during the winter season. It was revealed that Victoria Wood would direct the touring production and an all-new cast will be put together, led by Ria Jones as Mrs Overall. In order to cut down on the play's lengthy running time, Wood eliminated the original first act, incorporating the number "Tip Top Tap" into an expanded second act. The tour version of the show received fairly positive reviews, with the BBC calling it "a lot of fun".

In 2010 Phil McIntyre Entertainments gave permission for the first amateur production of the musical to be performed by non-professional actors in the UK.

Original West End cast and crew
Credits adapted from official website, DVD credits, and program.

Cast
Jenna Boyd – Hatcheck Girl / Mimi
Gareth Bryn – Steve / Hugh R Kettlewell
Lorraine Chappell – Suzy / Papergirl / Young Mrs Overall / Evelyn
Danielle Coombe – Sally / Miss Wellbelove / Debra
Paul Grunert – Vic / Mr Watkins
Shaun Henson – Ginger / Shopkeeper
Celia Imrie – Miss Babs
Josie Lawrence – Donna / Miss Bonnie
Sydney Livingstone – Ken / Mr Minchin
Jill Martin – Lynne / Christine
Neil Morrissey – John / Tony
Hilary O'Neil – Mavis / Bev
Duncan Preston – Mr Clifford
Carl Sanderson – Brian / Mr Furlong
Myra Sands – Barbara / Miss Willoughby
David Shaw Parker – Tom / Robert Stillman / Derek
Nicola Sloane – Pip / Miss Cuff
John Stacey – Alan / Postman
Sally Ann Triplett – Miss Berta
Julie Walters – Bo Beaumont / Mrs Overall
Victoria Wood – Bo Beaumont / Mrs Overall (understudy)

Crew
Lez Brotherston – Set design
Stephen Brimson Lewis – Costume design
Alistair Grant – Lighting design
Paul Groothuis – Sound design
Chris Walker – Orchestration
Pippa Ailion – Casting director
Gareth Valentine – Music supervisor, dance arrangements
Stephen Mear – Choreographer
Victoria Wood – Writer (book, music and lyrics)
Trevor Nunn – Director

Songs

Original production (London)
Because no official soundtrack has ever been released, neither has an official song list. Therefore, all songs are included in order, but most titles are unconfirmed.

Act I
Middle Class Show – Ensemble
Residents' Parking – Miss Babs, Mrs Overall, Miss Berta and Ensemble
Café Continental – Mrs Overall and Ensemble
Mine Alone (intro) – Mr Clifford
Mine Alone – Mr Clifford, Alan, Sally
Tip Top Tap – Mrs Overall and Ensemble
Tip Top Tap (reprise) – Mrs Overall and Ensemble

Act II
Manchesterford – Ensemble		
Acorn Antiques – Miss Babs, Miss Berta, Hugh, Mimi
Macaroons! – Mrs Overall		
Please Stay Here – Miss Bonnie, Miss Babs, Miss Berta	
We're on Our Way – Miss Babs, Miss Berta, Miss Bonnie, Hugh, Mimi			
Remind Him – Miss Berta
D.E.B.T. – Tony, Deb, Evelyn, Bev
Manchesterford (reprise) – Mrs Overall			
Back on Top – Miss Berta, Hugh, Mimi
I Am Going Out to Find Her – Miss Bonnie and Ensemble
Have You Met Miss Babs? – Miss Babs
Oh! Oh! Oh! Mrs O! – Ensemble
Macaroons! (reprise) – Mrs Overall and Ensemble
We're on Our Way (reprise) – Ensemble

Revised version (Tour)

Act I
Manchesterford – Company
Acorn Antiques – Babs, Berta, Hugh, Mimi
Macaroons! – Mrs Overall
Clifford's Anthem – Clifford
Please Stay Here – Bonnie, Berta, Babs, Clifford and Ensemble
We're on Our Way – Berta, Babs, Bonnie, Clifford, Hugh, Mimi
Have You Met Miss Babs? – Babs
Remind Him – Berta
Tip Top Tap – Berta, Babs, Bonnie and Ensemble

Act II
The Old Small Print – Tony, Deb, Evelyn, Bev, Bonnie
Mrs Overall's Farewell – Mrs Overall			
Remind Her – Clifford
Shagarama! – Bonnie, Berta, Babs and Ensemble
Gents' Duet – Derek, Mr Watkins
Once in a Lifetime – Bonnie and Ensemble
Oh! Oh! Oh! Mrs O! – Ensemble			
Macaroons! (reprise) – Mrs Overall and Ensemble
Finale – Ensemble

Awards and nominations

References

External links
Official website (archived from the original)

Acorn Antiques: The Musical at This Is Theatre (archived from the original)
Acorn Antiques review at WhatsOnStage.com (archived from the original)

2005 musicals
Laurence Olivier Award-winning musicals
Musicals based on television series
Plays set in England
West End musicals
Works by Victoria Wood